Partners Group Holding AG is a Swiss-based global private equity firm with US$135 billion in assets under management in private equity, private infrastructure, private real estate and private debt.

The firm manages a broad range of funds, structured products and customized portfolios for an international clientele of institutional investors, private banks and other financial institutions. The firm has completed more than 250 private equity investments in portfolio companies. As end of 2021, Partners Group is the fifth most-valuable publicly listed private markets firm in the world by market capitalization.

Since 2020 Partners Group is a component of the Swiss Market Index.

History 
Founded in 1996, the firm is headquartered in Zug, Switzerland with global offices. In 2019, the firm opened its 129,400-square-foot North American headquarters in Broomfield, Colorado.

Partners Group is a joint stock company under Swiss law, listed on the Swiss Exchange since its 2006 initial public offering (minority floating). Around 45% of the shares are held by all employees and partners. The firm's founding partners are Alfred Gantner, Marcel Erni, Urs Wietlisbach and Stefan Degen. As of 2016, according to Forbes' annual billionaire's list, founders Gantner, Erni, and Wietlisbach are listed as three of the 25 wealthiest private equity managers in the world, each with net worths totaling $1.3 billion.

Partners Group pioneered evergreen funds in private markets since 2001 and has launched also the first European Long Term Investment Fund (ELTIF) in 2017.

As of 30 November 2011, Partners Group has been included in the MSCI Switzerland Index after having been included in mid-September in the Swiss Small & Mid Cap Index (SMIM Index) which tracks the 30 biggest listed companies in Switzerland that are not listed by the Swiss Market Index.

In January 2018, Royal Dutch Shell purchased the company's 44% minority interest in solar energy firm Silicon Ranch for an estimated $200 million.

As of 18 September 2020 after closing, Partners Group is in the Swiss Market Index, its first trading day as part of the SMI being September 21.  The blue-chip SMI is the most prominent stock index in Switzerland, comprising the 20 largest Swiss stocks.

Partners Group was awarded firm of the year in Switzerland for four years in a row (2017-2020) by Private Equity international.

In 2020, Partners Group entered into a major cooperation with UBS in the form of a new private markets solution for its wealth management clients, targeting an annual investment capacity of US$1–3 billion over time.

In 2021, Partners Group was selected by Malaysia's Employees Provident Fund to manage a substantial portion of its US$600 million Shariah Private Equity Direct/Co-Investment Fund - the largest of its kind in the world.

Partners Group lead a consortium in the biggest Swiss 2022 venture capital investment in cleantech company Climeworks, the world's largest direct air capture and storage plant. Also in 2022, Partners Group invested USD 500 million in the energy-as-a-service company Budderfly which is providing, managing and financing energy efficiency systems for restaurants, retailers and assisted-living facilities.

In November 2022, Partners Group acquired EdgeCore for $1.2 billion, a Colorado-based data center owner and operator company.

On 23rd December 2022, the company bought the majority of the Swiss watch-maker Breitling from CVC. Alfred Gantner is taking over the presidency of Breitling's directorial board.

Controversies 
In January 2020, freight rail operating company MidRail accused the private equity firm of soliciting the rail company's business secrets to compete against it on a deal, in violation of a non-disclosure agreement previously signed and agreed to in 2017.  The lawsuit was filed in New York State Supreme Court.  According to the lawsuit, the company MidRail was forced to bid $100 million more for acquisition target Patriot Rail as a result of the breach in the confidentiality agreement.

References

External links 
 Partners Group (company website)
 Financial Times Profile
 PEI Awards: Carlyle and Partners Group win big. PEI Awards, 2013
 Silver Lake and Partners Group to Buy Global Blue for $1.25 Billion. The New York Times, 2012
 Partners Group Holding Closes Partners Group European Mezzanine Debt Program Above its EUR 500 Million Target. Reuters, 2010
 Partners Group successfully closes secondary fund at hard cap of EUR 2.5 billion. Bloomberg, 2009
 Partners Group Secondary 2006 closes on €1bn. AltAssets, 2006
 Partners Group opens London office and launches joint HSBC fund of funds. AltAssets, 2005
 Swiss fund of funds Partners Group opens Singapore office and launches Asia fund. AltAssets, 2004

Financial services companies established in 1996
Investment management companies of Switzerland
Private equity firms of Switzerland
Private equity secondary market
Companies listed on the SIX Swiss Exchange